Oom Island is a small island  northeast of Campbell Head, off the coast of Mac. Robertson Land. Mapped by Norwegian cartographers from air photos taken by the Lars Christensen Expedition, 1936–37, and named Uksoy. Renamed by Antarctic Names Committee of Australia (ANCA) for Lieutenant K.E. Oom, RAN, a member of the British Australian New Zealand Antarctic Research Expedition (BANZARE), 1929–31.

See also 
 List of Antarctic and sub-Antarctic islands

Islands of Mac. Robertson Land